Kimi Verma (born November 20, 1977, commonly known as Kimi Verma, is an Indian-American actress and fashion designer.

Early life

Kimi was born in Punjab on November 20, 1977, then later moved to the city of Bombay in India. Whilst working on her MBA at Bombay University, Kimi moved to Los Angeles and currently resides there. Kimi owns a small women's fashion house and is the Lead Designer and CEO of the company.

Kimi won the title of Miss Bombay and the Femina Miss India Beautiful Hair title in 1994. She has appeared in approximately nine movies, mainly Punjabi, in her near 30 year career. At present, she works as a clothing designer and lives in Los Angeles, California.

Career
Kimi's film career started with a small role in the film, Naseebo (1994) and was followed by a few Punjabi-language films, such as, Jee Aayan Nu, Asa Nu Maan Watna Da & Mera Pind - My Home.

Filmography

1994 Naseebo 
2000 Shaheed Udham Singh
2002 Jee Aayan Nu
2004 Asa Nu Maan Watna Da
2008 Mera Pind-My home
2009 Sat Shri Akal	
2010 Ik Kudi Punjab Di
2012 Ajj De Ranjhe
2021 Parvaaz: The Journey

References

External links
http://www.indiajournal.com/pages/event.php?id=4993
 Punjwood
https://web.archive.org/web/20160303173651/http://www.planetbollywood.com/displayArticle.php?id=s103108125610
 

1977 births
Living people
Actresses from Punjab, India
Indian emigrants to the United States
American actresses of Indian descent
American female models of Indian descent
American people of Punjabi descent
Punjabi people
American film actresses
Actresses in Punjabi cinema
American expatriate actresses in India
20th-century American actresses
21st-century American actresses